Fawzia Peer (born in Durban, South Africa) is a South African politician. In 2019 she briefly served as the Acting Mayor of the eThekwini Metropolitan Municipality.

References

Year of birth missing (living people)
People from Durban
Living people
South African politicians